These are the official results of the 2006 South American Championships in Athletics which took place from September 29 through October 1, 2006 in Tunja, Colombia.

Men's results

100 meters

Heats – September 29Wind:Heat 1: -2.8 m/s, Heat 2: -3.8 m/s

Final – September 29Wind:-2.0 m/s

200 meters

Heats – September 30Wind:Heat 1: -2.8 m/s, Heat 2: -3.8 m/s

Final – September 30Wind:-1.3 m/s

400 meters

Heats – September 29

Final – September 29

800 meters
October 1

1500 meters
September 30

5000 meters
October 1

10,000 meters
September 29

110 meters hurdles
September 29Wind: -3.0 m/s

400 meters hurdles

Heats – September 30

Final – September 30

3000 meters steeplechase
October 1

4 x 100 meters relay
September 30

4 x 400 meters relay
October 1

20,000 meters walk
September 30

High jump
September 30

Pole vault
September 29

Long jump
October 1

Triple jump
September 30

Shot put
October 1

Discus throw
September 29

Hammer throw
September 29

Javelin throw
October 1

Decathlon
September 29–30

Women's results

100 meters
September 29Wind: -2.1 m/s

200 meters
September 30Wind: -2.5 m/s

400 meters
September 29

800 meters
October 1

1500 meters
September 30

5000 meters
October 1

10,000 meters
September 29

100 meters hurdles
September 29Wind: -2.9 m/s

400 meters hurdles
September 30

3000 meters steeplechase
September 30

4 x 100 meters relay
September 29

4 x 400 meters relay
October 1

20,000 meters walk
October 1

High jump
October 1

Pole vault
September 29

Long jump
September 30

Triple jump
September 29

Shot put
September 30

Discus throw
September 30

Hammer throw
September 29

Javelin throw
September 30

Heptathlon
September 29–30

References

 (archived)

South American Championships
Events at the South American Championships in Athletics